In mathematics, ideas are supposedly not accepted as fact until they have been rigorously proved. However, there have been some ideas that were fairly accepted in the past but which were subsequently shown to be false. This article is meant to serve as a repository for compiling a list of such ideas.

The idea of the Pythagoreans that all numbers can be expressed as a ratio of two whole numbers. This was disproved by one of Pythagoras' own disciples, Hippasus, who showed that the square root of two is what we today call an irrational number. One story claims that he was thrown off the ship in which he and some other Pythagoreans were sailing because his discovery was too heretical.
Fermat conjectured that all numbers of the form  (what we call Fermat numbers) were prime. This, however, was disproved by Euler.
The idea that transcendental numbers were unusual. Disproved by Georg Cantor who showed that there are so many transcendental numbers that it is impossible to make a one-to-one mapping between them and the algebraic numbers. In other words, the cardinality of the set of transcendentals (denoted ) is greater than that of the set of algebraic numbers.
Bernhard Riemann, at the end of his famous 1859 paper "On the Number of Primes Less Than a Given Magnitude", stated (based on his results) that the logarithmic integral gives a somewhat too high estimate of the prime-counting function. The evidence also seemed to indicate this. However, in 1914 J. E. Littlewood proved that this was not always the case, and in fact it is now known that the first x for which  occurs somewhere before 10317. See Skewes' number for more detail.
Naïvely it might be expected that a continuous function must have a derivative or else that the set of points where it is not differentiable should be "small" in some sense. This was disproved in 1872 by Karl Weierstrass, using earlier found examples of functions that were continuous but nowhere differentiable (see Weierstrass function). According to Weierstrass in his paper, earlier mathematicians including Gauss had often assumed that such functions did not exist.
It was conjectured in 1919 by George Pólya, based on the evidence, that most numbers less than any particular limit have an odd number of prime factors. However, this Pólya conjecture was disproved in 1958. It turns out that for some values of the limit (such as values a bit more than 906 million), most numbers less than the limit have an even number of prime factors.
Erik Christopher Zeeman tried for 7 years to prove that one cannot untie a knot on a 4-sphere. Then one day he decided to try to prove the opposite, and he succeeded in a few hours.
A "theorem" of Jan-Erik Roos in 1961 stated that in an [AB4*] abelian category, lim1 vanishes on Mittag-Leffler sequences. This "theorem" was used by many people since then, but it was disproved by counterexample in 2002 by Amnon Neeman.

 Euler's sum of powers conjecture

See also
 List of conjectures for other disproved conjectures, which were not necessarily generally accepted as true before being disproved.
 List of incomplete proofs
 Mathematical fallacy
 Superseded theories in science

References

Disproved mathematical ideas